The Anderson–Gual Treaty (formally, the General Convention of Peace, Amity, Navigation, and Commerce) was an 1824 treaty between the United States and Gran Colombia. It is the first bilateral treaty that the United States concluded with another American country.

The treaty was concluded in Bogotá on 3 October 1824 and signed by U.S. diplomat Richard Clough Anderson and by Gran Colombian minister Pedro Gual Escandón. It was ratified by both countries and entered into force in May 1825.

The commercial provisions of the treaty granted reciprocal most-favored-nation status.

The treaty contained a clause that stated it would be in force for 12 years after ratification by both parties; the treaty therefore expired in 1837.

See also
United States–Central America Treaty

References
Michael L. Connif, Panama and the United States: The Forced Alliance (Athens, GA: University of Georgia Press, 2001) p. 11.

External links
Treaty text, archive.org.
A Guide to the United States' History of Recognition, Diplomatic, and Consular Relations, by Country, Since 1776: Colombia, history.state.gov.

1824 in Colombia
1824 treaties
1825 treaties
Colombia–United States relations
Commercial treaties
Treaties of Gran Colombia
Treaties of the United States